Flow rate may refer to:

 Flow measurement, a quantification of bulk fluid movement
 Mass flow rate, the mass of a substance which passes per unit of time
 Volumetric flow rate, the volume of fluid which passes per unit time
 Discharge (hydrology), volume rate of water flow that is transported through a given cross-sectional area, such as a river